Nightclubbing is the third studio album by Trance duo Blank & Jones. It was released in 2001.

In 2012 it was awarded a gold certification from the Independent Music Companies Association which indicated sales of at least 75,000 copies throughout Europe.

Track listing
"Invocatio" – 1:43
"Beyond Time" – 7:03
"DJs, Fans & Freaks" – 5:01
"Nightclubbing" – 5:29
"Le Grand Bleu" – 4:34
"Fragile" – 5:27
"Tribal Attack" – 4:36
"Electric Circus" – 6:08
"Darkness" – 5:59
"Sweet Revenge" – 5:19
"Heaven (Can Wait)" – 5:23
"Secrets & Lies" – 6:36

References

Blank & Jones albums
2001 albums